The Legislature XVII of Italy started on 15 March 2013 and ended on 22 March 2018. Its composition was the one resulting from the general election of 24–25 February 2013, called after the dissolution of the houses of Parliament announced by President Giorgio Napolitano on 22 December 2012.

The Parliament was dismissed after its term was completed, when President Sergio Mattarella dissolved the houses on 28 December 2017.

At the time of its foundation, this legislature had the lowest average age (48 years) and highest percentage of female MPs (31%) in Italian history.

Government

Composition

Chamber of Deputies

The number of elected deputies is 630.

 President: Laura Boldrini (SEL until 2 March 2017, afterwards Mixed), elected on 16 March 2013
 Vice Presidents: Marina Sereni (PD), Roberto Giachetti (PD), Luigi Di Maio (M5S), Simone Baldelli (FI–PdL)

Senate

The number of elected senators was 315. At the start of this legislature there were four life senators (Giulio Andreotti, Carlo Azeglio Ciampi, Emilio Colombo and Mario Monti), making the total number of senators equal to 319. At the end of the legislature, after the nomination of six new life senators (Claudio Abbado, Elena Cattaneo, Renzo Piano, Carlo Rubbia, Liliana Segre and Giorgio Napolitano as former living President of the Republic), and the deaths of Andreotti, Colombo, Abbado and Ciampi, the total number of senators became 321.

 President: Pietro Grasso (PD until 16 October 2017, afterwards Mixed), elected on 16 March 2013
 Vice Presidents: Valeria Fedeli (PD) (until 11 December 2016), Linda Lanzillotta (PD), Roberto Calderoli (Mixed–LN), Maurizio Gasparri (FI–PdL), Rosa Maria Di Giorgi (PD) (elected on 22 February 2017)

References

Legislatures of Italy